The National Academy of Arbitrators (NAA) is a not-for-profit 501(c)(3) honorary and professional organization of labor arbitrators in the United States and Canada that was founded in 1947.  Its avowed purpose was "to foster the highest standards of integrity, competence, honor and character among those engaged in the arbitration of industrial disputes."
Under the Academy’s stringent rules, only the most active and well-respected practitioners can be elected to membership, along with scholars who have made significant contributions to the field of labor law and relations. The Academy’s roughly 600 members cannot serve as advocates or consultants in labor disputes, associate with firms that perform those functions, or serve as expert witnesses on behalf of labor or management. Their interest is in the betterment of a fair and impartial arbitration process.

Members are chosen by involved parties to hear and decide thousands of labor and employment arbitration cases each year in private industry, the public sector and non-profits in both countries. Admission standards are rigorous in keeping with the goal of establishing and fostering the highest standards of integrity and competence. As of September 2010, the NAA had about 645 members.

The Academy’s purposes are educational and fraternal. As an amicus curiae (friend of the court), the Academy has participated in appellate litigation in both the United States and Canada where major issues affecting the integrity of arbitration are involved.

It also works cooperatively with sister organizations such as government agencies, professional organizations, institutions of higher learning, bar association committees, and other societies and associations in the field of labor-management and employment relations. In that regard, it was instrumental in adopting a "Due process protocol for arbitration", which among other things decries the use of mandatory pre-dispute arbitration agreements (outside of the collective bargaining agreement context.

The Academy is not an agency for the selection or appointment of arbitrators. It does invite and sponsor activities designed to improve the general understanding of the nature of arbitration and its use as a means of settling labor and employment disputes. It meets annually in May at a
national convention that is open to non-members, at its members-only Fall Education Conference, and more often at Regional meetings that are, from time to time, also open to nonmembers.

The Academy’s purposes are said to be:
 To establish and foster the highest standards of integrity, competence, honor, and character among those engaged in the arbitration of labor-management and other workplace disputes on a professional basis;
 To secure the acceptance of, and adherence to, the Code of Professional Responsibility for Arbitrators of Labor-Management Disputes of the National Academy of Arbitrators, American Arbitration Association, Federal Mediation and Conciliation Service (As amended and in effect September 2007) or of any amendments or changes which may be hereafter made thereto;
 To promote the study and understanding of the arbitration of labor-management and other workplace disputes; to encourage friendly association among the members of the profession;
 To cooperate with other organizations, institutions and learned societies interested in labor-management and employment relations, and
 To do any and all things which shall be appropriate in the furtherance of these purposes. (See, National Academy of Arbitrators' Constitution, Article II).

The Academy's official website, www.naarb.org, contains many resources including free access to over 50 volumes of "The Proceedings," recognized as authoritative commentary and research on the field of arbitration in labor management relations, the Code, the Due Process Protocol applicable to employment arbitration, and the Research and Education Foundation (REF), which accepts proposals for research and education grants meeting its specific criteria.

Academy members have produced two treatises - The Common Law of the Workplace, The Views of Arbitrators - Theodore J. St. Antoine, Editor, and Fifty Years in the World of Work - Gladys W. Gruenberg, Joyce M. Najita and Dennis R. Nolan, Editors. The website also includes the Academy's History, Officers and Committees, Constitution and By-Laws, Membership Guidelines, a Directory of Members with contact information, Regional Activities, as well as future meeting notices and registration information.

The organization meets twice per year: the "Annual meeting" is in late May, and includes participation by non-members; the fall "educational conference" where attendance is limited to members only.

Publications
On a yearly basis, through the Bureau of National Affairs, it publishes its proceedings, which are recognized as authoritative commentary and research on the field of arbitration in labor management relations.  The Proceedings are available on line.  See, Proceedings of the National Academy of Arbitrators, Vols. 1-63, 1948-2010.

The National Academy of Arbitrators produced a treatise-like book, The Common Law of the Workplace: The Views of Arbitrators, edited by Theodore J. St. Antoine and written by fifteen members of the NAA. The book is not official NAA Policy or viewpoint, but presents scholarly articles written with differing viewpoints. In fact, the arbitrators disagree with each other on some major points. As the title reflects, there is a difference of opinion as to whether there is a "common law of the shop." Upon careful reading, these analyses are tied to the record made before the arbitrator, and the unique elements of the contracts which the arbitrator is trying to apply and interpret. Black letter principles are followed by analytical examples. First-line arbitrators are not applying a monolithic "The law of the shop," but are instead trying to apply "The law of a shop.' The book gives some useful insight into how individual arbitration cases are really decided by arbitrators.

Bibliography

Further reading

 at Open Library

See also
 Arbitration
 Arbitration in the United States
 National Labor Relations Act
 Arnold M. Zack

References

External links
 
 Official website of National Academy of Arbitrators
Guide to the National Academy of Arbitrators. Papers, 1963-1985. 5246. Kheel Center for Labor-Management Documentation and Archives, Martin P. Catherwood Library, Cornell University.

Arbitration organizations
Labor relations organizations
Organizations established in 1947
1947 establishments in the United States